New Jersey Subway can refer to any underground rapid transit system in New Jersey. This includes the following:
 PATH (rail system) in Newark and Hudson County
 Newark Light Rail, which includes the Newark City Subway 
 PATCO Speedline, in Camden County
 River Line (NJ Transit), in Camden, Burlington, and Mercer Counties